Łódź Radogoszcz Zachód (English: Łódź Radogoszcz West) is a commuter railway station located in Łódź, in Bałuty district, between Zgierz and Łódź Żabieniec stations. It was built in early 2010s and opened in 2013 as part of Łódź Commuter Railway project. It serves only regional and commuter trains running from Łódź Kaliska station toward Łowicz and Kutno, as well as routes over the railway ring between Zgierz and Łódź Widzew stations. It bears the name after the estate, located right next to the station.

References 

Railway stations in Poland opened in 2013
Radogoszcz Zachód
Railway stations served by Przewozy Regionalne InterRegio
Railway stations served by Łódzka Kolej Aglomeracyjna